Leuconitocris dimidiaticornis is a species of beetle in the family Cerambycidae. It was described by Chevrolat in 1857.

Subspecies
 Dirphya dimidiaticornis dimidiaticornis (Chevrolat, 1857)
 Dirphya dimidiaticornis obliquesignata (Breuning, 1950)

References

Leuconitocris
Beetles described in 1857